Waitaha may refer to:

 Waitaha (Bay of Plenty iwi), a Māori tribe of New Zealand in the Bay of Plenty region
 Waitaha (South Island iwi), an historic Māori tribe on the South Island of New Zealand
 Waitaha penguin (Megadyptes waitaha), a species of penguin
 Waitaha Region, a region of New Zealand's South Island 
 Waitaha River, a river on New Zealand's South Island